Heteroponera angulata is a species of ant in the genus Heteroponera, endemic to Brazil. It was described by Borgmeier in 1959.

References

Heteroponerinae
Hymenoptera of South America
Insects described in 1959